Tom Marshall may refer to:

 Tom Marshall (actor), British  actor
Tom Marshall (artist) (born 1988), British photo colouriser and artist
 Tom Marshall (basketball) (born 1931), basketball player and coach
 Tom Marshall (Bible teacher) (1921–1993), international Bible teacher
 Tom Marshall (poet) (1938–1993), Canadian poet and novelist
 Tom Marshall (politician) (born 1946), Newfoundland and Labrador politician
 Tom Marshall (singer) (born 1963), American singer/songwriter known for his association with the band Phish
 Tom Marshall (rugby union) (born 1990), New Zealand rugby union player
 Tom Marshall (runner) (born 1989), Welsh middle-distance runner and competitor at the 2018 Commonwealth Games

See also
 Thomas Marshall (disambiguation)